St Francis Xavier's College Hamilton is a Catholic secondary school located within the suburb of Hamilton, Newcastle, New South Wales, Australia. Founded in 1985 by the Marist Brothers as a Year 7-10 boys high school, the school is now co-educational and offers a variety of subjects to students in Year Eleven and Twelve. The school's enrolment was about 850 in 1986 and exceeded 1,000 for the first time in 1994. The school's motto, "Christus Lux Mea", is Latin for "Christ My Light".

The school primarily accepts enrolments from surrounding junior Catholic high schools in the area, including San Clemente, Mayfield and St Pius X. Until 2018, the college also provided Year 11 and 12 for students enrolled at St Mary's High School. 

The school has four houses: Champagnat (named after Marcellin Champagnat), Dominic (named after Saint Dominic), MacKillop (named after Mary Mackillop) and McAuley (named after Catherine McAuley).

Alma mater
Dave Gleeson, the Screaming Jets singer, met his band members while attending St Francis Xavier's College.

Australian rugby player Paul Dan is both a former student and current staff member of St Francis Xavier's College. Other sports people to attend the College include Danny Buderus, Anthony Tupou, Owen Craigie and Jarrod Mullen.

References

External links
 Official website

Educational institutions established in 1985
Newcastle, New South Wales
Catholic secondary schools in New South Wales
1985 establishments in Australia